Trade It All may refer to:

"Trade It All", 2001 song by Fabolous featuring Jagged Edge
Trade It All, 2006 album by Orlando Brown (actor)
"Trade It All", 2015 single by Demetria McKinney